Jerry Flora is an American football coach.  He was the head football coach at William Paterson University in Wayne Township, New Jersey from 2008 to 2017, compiling a record of 33–67. He was replaced by Dustin Johnson following the 2017 season.

Head coaching record

References

External links
 William Patterson profile

Year of birth missing (living people)
Living people
American football offensive tackles
Fairleigh Dickinson–Florham Devils football coaches
Iona Gaels football coaches
Iona Gaels football players
William Paterson Pioneers football coaches
People from White Plains, New York